Tikaboo Valley is a valley in Lincoln County, Nevada, United States. Its geographical coordinates are 37.1563494 and -115.4016881. It has an elevation of 3,793 feet or 1,156 meters.

Climate
The climate there is dry, even on cool mornings after a rainfall.

Fauna
Biologist Chris Smith has studied flora and fauna in the area including Joshua trees and moths. It appears that this may be the only place where two types of Joshua tree, namely the Eastern and Western varieties have come together. Part of the reason for this is the possibility of Climate change which could account for the northward appearance of a hybridized species.

Military use
B-52H and B-1B Bombers often do low-level runs there. There have been other military tests there.

See also
 List of valleys of Nevada

References

External links

Central Basin and Range ecoregion
Valleys of Nevada
Valleys of Lincoln County, Nevada